Colina is a municipality in the state of São Paulo in Brazil. The population is 18,535 (2020 est.) in an area of 422 km². The elevation is 595 m. Colina is the Horse Capital of Brazil. It is also the large centre of a horse ranch, the Estação Experimental de Zootecnia. In July, there is a party called Festa do Cavalo. Many Lebanese immigrants live in Colina.

Born in Colina 
 Augusto Cury, (1958) MD and writer.

References

External links
  Municipality of Colina
  Colina's History
  Colina's view from the space
 Colina's Lebanese Genealogical Tree

Municipalities in São Paulo (state)